The 1950–51 season was the 78th season of competitive football in Scotland and the 54th season of the Scottish Football League.

Scottish League Division A

Champions: Hibernian
Relegated: Clyde, Falkirk

Scottish League Division B

Promoted: Queen of the South, Stirling Albion

Scottish League Division C

Cup honours

Other honours

National

County

 * – aggregate over two legs
  – replay

Highland League

Scotland national team

1951 British Home Championship – winners

Key:
 (H) = Home match
 (A) = Away match
 BHC = British Home Championship

Notes and references

External links
Scottish Football Historical Archive

 
Seasons in Scottish football